Bodi Brusselers (born 12 December 1998) is a Dutch professional footballer who plays as an attacking midfielder for Greek Super League 2 club Doxa Drama.

Club career
Brusselers is a youth exponent from NAC Breda. He made his Eerste Divisie debut on 5 August 2016 against Jong FC Utrecht.

After having spent the 2018-19 season on loan at Helmond Sport, the club signed him permanently on 24 August 2019.

Personal life
Bodi is a son of former NAC player Geert Brusselers and a grandson of former PSV player Toon Brusselers.

References

External links
 
 Profile - NAC

1998 births
Living people
Footballers from Breda
Association football midfielders
Dutch footballers
Eredivisie players
Eerste Divisie players
NAC Breda players
Helmond Sport players